Edmund Hlawka (November 5, 1916, Bruck an der Mur, Styria – February 19, 2009) was an Austrian mathematician. He was a leading number theorist. Hlawka did most of his work at the Vienna University of Technology. He was also a visiting professor at Princeton University and the Sorbonne. Hlawka died on February 19, 2009, in Vienna.

Education and career 
Hlawka studied at the University of Vienna from 1934 to 1938, when he gained his doctorate under Nikolaus Hofreiter. Among his PhD students were Rainer Burkard, later to become president of the Austrian Society for Operations Research, graph theorist Gert Sabidussi, Cole Prize winner Wolfgang M. Schmidt, Walter Knödel who became one of the first German computer science professors, and Hermann Maurer, also a computer scientist. Through these and other students, Hlawka has nearly 1500 academic descendants. Hlawka was awarded the Decoration for Services to the Republic of Austria in 2007.

Honours and awards
 Decoration for Science and Art (Austria, 1963)
 City of Vienna Prize for the Humanities (1969)
 Decoration for Services to the Republic of Austria, Grand Decoration of Honour in Gold with Star (2007); Grand Decoration of Honour in Gold (1987)
 Wilhelm Exner Medal (1982).
 Joseph Johann Ritter von Prechtl Medal (1989)
 Erwin Schrödinger Prize

See also
Minkowski–Hlawka theorem
Koksma–Hlawka inequality
10763 Hlawka, an asteroid named after Edmund Hlawka

References

1916 births
2009 deaths
People from Bruck an der Mur
Austrian mathematicians
Number theorists
Princeton University faculty
Academic staff of the University of Paris
Academic staff of TU Wien
Academic staff of the University of Vienna
University of Vienna alumni
Recipients of the Grand Decoration with Star for Services to the Republic of Austria
Recipients of the Austrian Decoration for Science and Art